Hafizabad may refer to:
 Hafizabad, Khvaf
 Hafizabad, Zaveh

See also
Hafezabad (disambiguation)